Mărculești Air Force Base  is an air base of the Moldovan Air Force, located in Florești district, in the north of Moldova.

Aircraft on display

Active 

 3 Mi-8
 1 Mi-17
 2 AN-2
 1 AN-26

Stored 

 1 An-30
 6 MiG-29-sold to USA

See also
 
 Civil Aviation Administration of Moldova
 List of airports in Moldova
 Moldovan ICAO Airport Codes

References

Airports in Moldova
Airports built in the Soviet Union
Florești District
Military of Moldova